Vasile Nicolae Popa (born 26 April 1969) is a Romanian former football central defender. His son, Alin Popa was also a footballer.

International career
Vasile Popa played one friendly game at international level for Romania when he came as a substitute, replacing Anton Doboș in the 86th minute of a 2–1 victory against Greece.

Honours
Argeș Pitești
Divizia B: 1993–94

Notes

References

External links
 

1969 births
Living people
People from Olt County
Romanian footballers
Romania international footballers
Association football defenders
Liga I players
Liga II players
Chimia Râmnicu Vâlcea players
FC Olt Scornicești players
FC Argeș Pitești players
FC Rapid București players
ACF Gloria Bistrița players
CS Mioveni players